Bodak is the surname of the following notable people:
Bob Bodak (born 1961), Canadian ice hockey player
Chuck Bodak (1916–2009), American boxing cutman and trainer 
Joanna Bodak (born 1974), Polish rhythmic gymnast
Martin Bodák (born 1998), Slovak ice hockey defenceman 
Peter Bodak (born 1961), English football winger
Sergei Bodak (born 1964), Russian football player